Detlev Buck (born 1 December 1962 in Bad Segeberg) is a German film director, actor, producer and screenwriter.

Life and work
From his first short film at the age of 21 in 1982, he has remained one of the most important filmmakers working in Germany. His first feature, 1991's Karniggels, put him on the international radar and since then he has continued to make both short and feature films. He is known for making cameo appearances in his work and acting in films of fellow directors. A nice example of his acting skills can be seen in Blue Moon.

Selected filmography
As director
 1984: 
 1991:  (with Bernd Michael Lade, Ingo Naujoks and Julia Jäger)
 1993: No More Mr. Nice Guy (with Joachim Król, Horst Krause and Sophie Rois)
 1996: Jailbirds (with Til Schweiger, Marie Bäumer and Heike Makatsch)
 1999:  (with Moritz Bleibtreu and Heike Makatsch)
 2000:  (with Anke Engelke)
 2006: Tough Enough (with David Kross)
 2007: Hände weg von Mississippi (Family film)
 2009: Same Same But Different (with Apinya Sakuljaroensuk and David Kross)
 2011:  (with Matthias Schweighöfer and Alexandra Maria Lara)
 2012: Measuring the World (Adaptation of the book of the same name)
 2014: Bibi & Tina (Family film)
 2014: Bibi & Tina: Voll verhext! (Family film)
 2016: Bibi & Tina: Mädchen gegen Jungs (Family film)
 2017: Bibi & Tina: Tohuwabohu Total (Family film)
 2018: Asphaltgorillas
 2018: Wuff – Folge dem Hund
 2021: 

As actor
 1984:  (Short) ... Gerhard Ramm 
 1994: Back to Square One - Dir. Reinhard Münster (with Katharina Thalbach and Harald Juhnke) ... Chauffeur
 1995: Under the Milky Way - Dir.  (with Fabian Busch and Sophie Rois) ... Instructor
 1996: Jailbirds (with Til Schweiger, Marie Bäumer and Heike Makatsch) ... Hammer-Gerd 
 1999: Sonnenallee - Dir. Leander Haußmann (with Alexander Beyer, Henry Hübchen, Robert Stadlober, Katharina Thalbach) ... Policeman Horkefeld 
 1999: Aimée & Jaguar - Dir. Max Färberböck (with Maria Schrader and Juliane Köhler) ... Günther Wust 
 2000:  (with Anke Engelke) ... Wusch
 2002: Blue Moon - Dir. Andrea Maria Dusl (with Josef Hader) ... Ignaz Springer 
 2003: Berlin Blues - Dir. Leander Haußmann (with Christian Ulmen) ... Karl
 2005: NVA - Dir. Leander Haußmann ... Colonel Kalt 
 2005:  - Dir. Leander Haußmann ... Wurm
 2007: Midsummer Madness - Dir. Alexander Hahn ... Axel
 2009: The White Ribbon - Dir. Michael Haneke ... Eva's father
 2009: 12 Paces Without a Head - Dir.  ... Arms Dealer
 2009: Contact High - Dir. Michael Glawogger ... Harry
 2011:  (with Matthias Schweighöfer and Alexandra Lara) ... Jürgen Honk
 2012: Waiting for the Sea - Dir. Bakhtyar Khudojnazarov (with Egor Beroev and Anastasiya Mikulchina) ... Balthazar
 2013:  ... Policeman Müller
 2014: Bibi & Tina ... Dr. Eichhorn 
 2014:  - Dir.  ... Helmut 
 2014: Bibi & Tina: Voll verhext! ... Dr. Eichhorn 
 2016: Bibi & Tina: Mädchen gegen Jungs ... Dr. Eichhorn 
 2017: Bibi & Tina: Tohuwabohu Total ... Dr. Eichhorn 
 2017:  - Dir. Leander Haußmann ... Holger 
 2017: Magical Mystery or: The Return of Karl Schmidt
 2020: Lindenberg! Mach dein Ding - Dir. Hermine Huntgeburth ... Mattheisen

Awards
 1991 Bavarian Film Awards, Best New Director
 1993 43rd Berlin International Film Festival Wir können auch anders … - Honourable Mention.
 2007 Bavarian Film Award, Best Young People's Film

References

External links
 
 Detlev Buck an Interview (Germany)

1962 births
Living people
People from Segeberg
Film people from Schleswig-Holstein
German male film actors
20th-century German male actors
21st-century German male actors
Actors from Schleswig-Holstein